Esha Sethi Thirani (born in Kolkata, 9 October 1986) is an Indian fashion designer with her own label based in the cultural city of Calcutta, once the capital of British India, situated in the eastern part of the country. She is deeply inspired by shapes, architecture and nature which ultimately find their way into her eclectic aesthetic. Her attention to detail, and curiosity for style beyond the ordinary, presented itself in luxurious fabrications and embroideries that is a signature for her creations. With its roots dug in quality craftsmanship and sophisticated tailoring, Esha Sethi Thirani creates modern designs combined with traditional Indian art and craft. Her technical knowledge of a garment’s proper fit and design, combined with her artistic eye and design sensibility, results in an effortless, affordable and wearable line that reflects the kind of woman she is herself; strong, fun, and fearless. She showcased her Autumn Winter 2018 Couture Collection ‘QALAMKAR' at The Intercontinental, Le Grand Palais, Paris, during The Paris Fashion Week.

Career 
Upon graduating from Lancaster University in the UK with an M.A in Human Resources and Knowledge management in 2008, Esha returned to Kolkata realizing her true calling was in the field of fashion and creative arts.

She began her career studying fashion design at The Bhawanipur Education Society College, where she won the ‘Designer of the Year’ award in 2012.

She started her eponymous label ‘Esha Sethi Thirani' in 2013.

In 2018, Esha Sethi Thirani showcased her Autumn Winter 2018 Couture Collection ‘QALAMKAR' on 3 March 2018 at The Intercontinental, Le Grand Palais, Paris, during The Paris Fashion Week.

Bollywood and Esha 
Esha Sethi Thirani has styled celebrities like Shraddha Kapoor, Sonakshi Sinha, Aditi Rao Hydari, Taapsee Pannu, Lara Dutta, Amyra Dastur, Shriya Saran, Gauhar Khan, etc.

References 

Bibliography
 Miss Malini
 Vogue

1986 births
Living people
Indian women fashion designers
Artists from Kolkata
Women artists from West Bengal
Bhawanipur Education Society College alumni
University of Calcutta alumni